Trauth is a surname, and may refer to:

 Andrew James Trauth (born 1986), American actor and musician
 Gero Trauth, German artist
 Denise M. Trauth, ninth president of Texas State University - San Marcos
 Louis Trauth, founder of Louis Trauth Dairy

See also 
 Eric Traut
 Hans Traut

German-language surnames